This article gives statistics of the Swiss Super League in the 1915–16 association football season.

East

Table

Central

Table

West

Table

Final

Table

Results 

|colspan="3" style="background-color:#D0D0D0" align=center|16 April 1916

|-
|colspan="3" style="background-color:#D0D0D0" align=center|18 June 1916

|-
|colspan="3" style="background-color:#D0D0D0" align=center|25 June 1916

|}

Cantonal Neuchâtel won the championship.

Sources 
 Switzerland 1915-16 at RSSSF

Seasons in Swiss football
Swiss Football League seasons
1915–16 in Swiss football
Swiss